Grangeville is an unincorporated community in St. Helena Parish, Louisiana, United States.

Etymology
In 1916 the New Orleans, Natalbany and Natchez Railway built a line that terminated in the community. A local barn was converted into a cooperative business that housed a general store, blacksmith, two doctors, a pharmacy and a brickyard. The railroad named the community after the barn that was converted into a store. The name of the community is borrowed from the word grange which means 'barn' and is derived from Old French.

References

Unincorporated communities in St. Helena Parish, Louisiana
Unincorporated communities in Louisiana